Amaranthus edulis can refer to:

Amaranthus edulis Michx. ex Moq., a synonym of Amaranthus cannabinus (L.) J.D.Sauer
Amaranthus edulis Speg., a synonym of Amaranthus caudatus L.